Laure Killing (12 January 1959 – 18 November 2019) was a French actress who appeared in more than fifty films from 1986 on.

Killing died of cancer on 18 November 2019, aged 60.

Selected filmography

References

External links 
 

2019 deaths
French film actresses
French television actresses
1959 births
20th-century French actresses
21st-century French actresses